Nothing is Okay is the third album by The Everybodyfields, co-founded and fronted by Sam Quinn and Jill Andrews. The album was released August 21, 2007.

Critical reception

Hal Horowitz of AllMusic concludes his review with, "Surely this isn't for parties, unless it's a pity party, yet there is a calming poignancy generated by the combination of gorgeous harmonies and exquisite songs that is hypnotic and quietly captivating."

Robin Aigner of American Songwriter writes, "Nothing Is Okay is yet another indie release that is wiser and wittier than anything you’re likely to hear on the FM, with hooks far tastier than the gruel they’re force-feeding on the MTV."

Rachael Maddux of Paste Magazine reviews the album and concludes with, " Sometimes love don’t feel like it should, but who’s to say what’s right or wrong with sadness this divine?"

Jason Gonulsen's Glide Magazine review of Nothing Is Okay states, "The truth is that the everybodyfields make it and play it like no other band I have heard in quite a long time."

See original reviews for full articles.

Track listing

 "Worker's Playtime" is a hidden track which plays after "Out On The Highway" ends. It is an extended version of the theme song of the WQFS radio show of the same name hosted by Kathy Clark.

References

The Everybodyfields albums
2007 albums